The Balfour–Guthrie Building is a building located in downtown Portland, Oregon listed on the National Register of Historic Places.

See also
 National Register of Historic Places listings in Southwest Portland, Oregon

References

Further reading

External links

 Balfour Guthrie Building, LEED Silver Historic Building City of Portland, Bureau of Planning and Sustainability.

1913 establishments in Oregon
Buildings and structures completed in 1913
Neoclassical architecture in Oregon
National Register of Historic Places in Portland, Oregon
Southwest Portland, Oregon